Dust Commander (February 8, 1967 – October 7, 1991) was an American Thoroughbred race horse.

Background
The name "Dust Commander" is derived from his dam, Dust Storm, and his sire, Bold Commander. A descendant of Nearco, Dust Commander was bred by the Pullen brothers. He was owned by Robert E. Lehmann and trained by Don Combs. His dam Dust Storm was descended from the American broodmare  Laughing Queen (foaled 1929) who was also the female-line ancestor of Tom Fool.

Racing career

In a 3-year racing career, Dust Commander had 8 wins, 5 places and 4 shows in 42 starts. He finished his career with $215,012 in winnings. Some of the highlights of his career include winning as a 2-year-old the City of Miami Beach Handicap and as a 3-year-old the Blue Grass Stakes, a Kentucky Derby prep race.

On May 2, 1970, with Mike Manganello aboard, Dust Commander won the 96th running of the Kentucky Derby in 2:03.4 ahead of My Dad George and High Echelon.

Hunter S. Thompson's seminal 1970 essay "The Kentucky Derby is Decadent and Depraved" detailed the running of the Derby won by Dust Commander.

Stud record
Standing at stud, Dust Commander sired the 1975 Preakness Stakes winner, Master Derby.

In 2006, the family of the late Robert E. Lehmann donated Dust Commander's Kentucky Derby Trophy to the Kentucky Derby Museum.

Pedigree

References

 Dust Commander's offspring at the Triple Crown database by Kathleen Irwin and Joy Reeves

1967 racehorse births
1991 racehorse deaths
Racehorses bred in Illinois
Racehorses trained in the United States
Kentucky Derby winners
Thoroughbred family 3-j